A Film Score of a Bag of Hammers is the third full-length album by Johnny Flynn & The Sussex Wit, written as the soundtrack to Brian Crano's 2011 film A Bag of Hammers. It was released on limited vinyl on 21 April 2012, as part of Record Store Day and on digital on 10 December.

Track listing

Side A

Side B

References

Johnny Flynn (musician) albums
Transgressive Records albums
2012 albums